Robert Ramsay (1594–1651) was a minister of the Church of Scotland who served as Principal of Glasgow University.

Life

He was born at Dalhousie Castle south of Edinburgh the son of George Ramsay (1571-1629) and his wife Margaret Colville.
 
He was educated at Glasgow University graduating MA in 1618. He began work as a schoolteacher in Irvine, but then from 1625 served as a Church of Scotland minister at Dundonald, South Ayrshire. In December 1640 he translated to Blackfriars Church in Glasgow. In April 1647 he moved to St Mungo's Church, Glasgow .

In 1648 he was elected Rector of Glasgow University and was appointed Principal on 28 August 1651 in place of John Strang (who had resigned). However, he died on 4 September of the same year, after only a few days in office.

He is buried in Canongate Kirkyard in Edinburgh.

Family
He married twice: firstly Marion Mure of Airdhill granddaughter and heir of William Mure of Irvine; secondly Janet Campbell, daughter of Hugh Campbell of Hullerhurst. By the second marriage he had a son, James Ramsay (1624-1696), Bishop of Dunblane, and a daughter Margaret Ramsay, who married Alexander Mylne of Linlithgow.

References
 

1594 births
1651 deaths
Principals of the University of Glasgow